The 2nd World Festival of Youth and Students featured an athletics competition among its programme of events. The events were contested in Budapest, Hungary, between 15 and 21 August 1949. Mainly contested among Eastern European athletes, it served as an alternative to the more Western European-oriented 1949 Summer International University Sports Week held in Merano the same year.

The women's events provided the most prominent top level athletes. Hungary's Olga Gyarmati, the reigning long jump champion from the 1948 Summer Olympics, won her specialist event along with a silver medal in the 80 metres hurdles. The 1946 European Championships high jump silver medallist Aleksandra Chudina also won in her speciality and medalled in four other events as well. Several of the competing athletes went on to compete at the 1952 Summer Olympics three years later. A handful of participants were later among the top in their field, including: Leonid Shcherbakov (1950 and 1954 European triple jump winner), Yevgeniy Bulanchik (1954 European hurdles champion) and 1952 Olympic medallists Vladimir Kazantsev, Yuriy Lituyev and Klavdiya Tochonova.

Medal summary

Men

 Exact mark not unverified

Women

Medal table

References

Results
World Student Games (UIE). GBR Athletics. Retrieved on 2014-12-09.

World Festival of Youth and Students
World Festival of Youth and Students
International athletics competitions hosted by Hungary
20th century in Budapest
International sports competitions in Budapest
1949